The participation of Azerbaijan in the Turkvision Song Contest first began in Eskişehir, Turkey, at the inaugural edition of the Turkvision Song Contest in 2013. Azad Azerbaijan TV (ATV) have been responsible for the selection process of their participants, since their debut in 2013. Farid Hasanov was the first representative for Azerbaijan at the Turkvision Song Contest 2014 with the song "Yaşa", which qualified from the semifinals and won the contest, achieving two-hundred and ten points in the grand final. Azerbaijan continued to participate in the contest, and sent Elvin Ordubadli as their representative in the Turkvision Song Contest 2014, with the song "Divlərin yalnızlığı", which finished in ninth place, achieving 177 points in the grand final.

Origins of the contest
Turkvision is an annual song contest which was created by TÜRKSOY in cooperation with the Turkish music channel TMB TV. Based on the similar format of the Eurovision Song Contest, Turkvision focuses primarily on participating Turkic countries and regions. The participating countries and regions have to take part in the Semi Final. A juror from each nation awards between 1 and 10 points for every entry, except their own. An amount of 12 to 15 nations qualify for the Grand Final where the jury determines the winner. TÜRKSOY has stated that televoting is going to be introduced in the future. Unlike the Eurovision Song Contest in which the winning country proceeds to host the following year's event, hosting of the Turkvision Song Contest takes place in the country or region that is also hosting the Turkish Capital of Culture.

History

Turkvision Song Contest 2013

Azerbaijan made their debut in the 2013 festival, in Eskişehir, Turkey.  The Azeri broadcaster Azad Azerbaijan TV organised the entry selection, which took place on 16 November 2013. The Azeri broadcaster ATV organised a four show national selection called "Turkvision Milli Seçim Turu", a total of 50 singers auditioned in the three casting shows on 19 October, 26 October and 2 November 2013. 10 singers were selected by a jury to go through to the final on 23 November. A jury made up of Vado Karoven, Govhar Hasanzada, Nigar Jamal, Mubariz Tagıyev, Eldar Mansurov and Ahmet Koch selected the artist that would represent Azerbaijan at the first Turkvision Song Contest, Farid Hasanov won the selection.

At the contest in Turkey it emerged that the song that Farid had won the national selection with, "Sensiz", would not be the song that he would sing at the contest, and was replaced by "Yaşa". Azerbaijan qualified for the final and went on to win the contest with a total of 210 points.

Turkvision Song Contest 2014

It was announced in May 2014 that Azerbaijan would participate in the 2014 contest, ATV changed the selection process to use Azerbaycan'ın Sesi. The selection process began in July 2014 with the final taking place on 21 September, Elvin Ordubadli was selected by a jury to represent Azerbaijan in Kazan. It was announced after Elvin won the national selection that he would sing "Divlərin yalnızlığı" at the contest.

Azerbaijan were drawn to perform 21st out of the 25 countries, when the result of the semi final were originally announced Azerbaijan did not qualify for the final, they had finished 14th 2 points away from a place in the final. It emerged after the show that the points had been incorrectly calculated for Turkmenistan who had previously been announced as a qualifier, after adjusting the results it was decided that the top 15 countries in the semi final would participate in the final. Azerbaijan came 9th in the final with a total of 177 points.

Turkvision Song Contest 2015

Azerbaijan confirmed that they would compete in the 3rd Turkvision Song Contest on 9 May 2015. On 29 September 2015 Mehman Tagiyev was selected to represent Azerbaijan at the contest, he won the televised selection process Azərbaycanın səsi. On 8 October it was announced that Mehman Tagiyev would be performing the song "Istanbul". At the contest Azerbaijan finished in 7th place with 155 points.

Turkvision Song Contest 2016

Azerbaijan confirmed that they would compete in the 4th Turkvision Song Contest on 29 March 2016, when applications to compete in the Azerbaijani selection opened. The judges in the selection were revealed on June 15, with changes to the line up made. The selection process for Turkvision 2016 began on July 1 and culminated in a final on September 29, with Sevinc Beyaz being selected to take part in the contest.

Turkvision Song Contest 2020

Azerbaijan confirmed that they would compete in the 5th Turkvision Song Contest on 25 October 2020. , who was selected to represent Azerbaijan in the Bala Turkvision Song Contest 2016 before its cancellation, was internally selected to represent Azerbaijan. This marked the first time an internal selection had been used to select the country's Turkvision representative. She competed with the song "Can Can Qardaş Can" and finished in 5th place with 193 points.

Participation

See also 
 Azerbaijan in the Eurovision Dance Contest
 Azerbaijan in the Eurovision Song Contest
 Azerbaijan in the Junior Eurovision Song Contest

References 

 
Turkvision